Known informally as the Octagon Building, the redbrick octagonal building at 118 Cooper Street (at the corner of Front Street) in Santa Cruz, California was built in 1882, adjacent to the first (1866) County Court House, to serve as the County Hall of Records. In 1894, a major fire destroyed most of the nearby buildings, including the adjacent courthouse, but the brick Octagon survived.

In 1968, the records were moved to a new County Government Center. Many historic brick buildings on the Pacific Garden Mall were damaged during the 1989 Loma Prieta earthquake, but again the Octagon survived. On March 24, 1971, it was added to the National Register of Historic Places.

Since 1993, the Octagon has been used as the Museum Store for the adjacent Santa Cruz Museum of Art and History (MAH), and later as a coffeehouse. Vacant as of October 2016, the building is administered by the MAH.

See also
 National Register of Historic Places listings in Santa Cruz County, California
 Octagon house

References

External links

 Institutions in Santa Cruz County – 1850–1950
 The History of the Santa Cruz Courthouse by Margaret Souza

Santa Cruz, California
History of Santa Cruz County, California
Octagonal buildings in the United States
Buildings and structures in Santa Cruz County, California
Government buildings on the National Register of Historic Places in California
Government buildings completed in 1882
National Register of Historic Places in Santa Cruz County, California